This is a list of characters from Shiloh by Phyllis Reynolds Naylor published in 1991.

Characters

 Shiloh - a shy brown and cute white Beagle who escapes from his rude former owner Judd Travers and the main protagonist of the books and films. 
 Martin "Marty" Preston - an 11-year-old boy who finds Shiloh and wants to keep him. He is a son of Ray and Lou Preston and the older brother of Dara Lynn and Becky Preston. By "A Shiloh Christmas" Marty is twelve.
 Judd Travers - the drinks rude man who owns Shiloh until the end of the book. He is cruel to his dogs, but Judd's father began physically abusing Judd when he was four years old. In the end, Judd warms to Marty, relents, and lets him keep Shiloh.
 Raymond "Ray" Preston - Marty, Dara Lynn, and Becky's strict father, a mail carrier. 
 Louanne "Lou" Preston - Marty, Dara Lynn, and Becky's sympathetic mother who does odd jobs from home.
 Dara Lynn Preston - Marty and Becky's 7-year-old sister. Marty and Dara Lynn don't get along, but deep down they love each other. Dara Lynn wants a cat, but her family can't afford to have one. At the end of "Saving Shiloh", Marty buys Dara Lynn a cat for her birthday. By "A Shiloh Christmas" Dara Lynn is eight years old. 
 Rebecca "Becky" Preston - Marty and Dara Lynn's 3-year-old sister. By "A Shiloh Christmas" Becky is four years old. 
 David Howard - Marty's best friend.
 Dr. Taylor Murphy - a doctor who heals Shiloh.
 Mrs. Howard - David's mom
 Tangerine - Dara Lynn's cat. Marty buys Tangerine at the end of "Saving Shiloh" and gives Tangerine to Dara Lynn for her birthday.
 Mr. Wallace - a man who owns a store down in the town. In the film, Mr. Wallace's name is Doc Wallace and he and his wife take care of their granddaughter Sam Wallace after her parents die in an accident. 
 Dr. Collins - a veterinarian/a doctor for animals that Marty works for.
 Mrs. Baker's German Shepherd Dog – a large dog that attacked Shiloh.
 Judith Dawes - the pastor's wife
 Rachel Dawes - one of the two daughters Pastor Dawes has, Marty's classmate.

References
Notes

Shiloh